The Khao Ang Rue Nai Wildlife Sanctuary is a protected area at the western extremities of the Cardamom Mountains in Chachoengsao Province, Thailand. Founded in 1977, it is an IUCN Category IV wildlife sanctuary, with an area of 674,352 rai ~ . South-east of, and connected with, the wildlife sanctuary is the Khao Sip Ha Chan National Park. South-west of the protection is the Khao Chamao–Khao Wong National Park.

The sanctuary is partly covered by lowland evergreen forest, along with dry and moist evergreens, mixed deciduous, deciduous dipterocarp, as well as grassland.

Human-elephant conflict
The Thai Department of National Parks (DNP) has estimated that in 2008 the elephant population of Khao Ang Rue Nai was just 219 animals. In recent years this number has grown by 9.83 percent per year, meaning that the reserve now has 275 or so elephants. The twenty new animals born every year exceed the death rate. Their expanding population has meant that they travel further afield in search of food. Thus the villages that border the sanctuary are subject to about 25 raids on crops per month. Due to the average crop damage of six rai per year per household, crop damage costs each household nearly 35,000 baht or 19 percent of average household income. Affected households spend an average of 212 nights awake per year guarding their fields. The DNP has resorted to various measures to reduce the conflict, including growing food crops in the forest for the animals. A spokesman for the DNP noted, on behalf of the elephants, that, "We are also encroaching into forest, making it harder for elephants, which already face limited food sources....it is our task not to invade their homes."

Source 
Khao Angruenai in Thailand

References

Protected areas established in 1977
Wildlife sanctuaries of Thailand
Cardamom Mountains
IUCN Category IV
1977 establishments in Thailand